A circus is a traveling company of performers that may include acrobats, clowns, trained animals, and other novelty acts.

Circus or The Circus may also refer to:

Art and architecture
 Roman circus, an open-air public space in the Roman Empire
 The Circus, Bath, a structure in Bath, Somerset, England
 The Circus (Seurat), an 1891 painting by Georges Seurat

Literature
 Circus (magazine), an American rock music magazine 1966–2006
 Circus (novel), a 1975 novel by Alistair MacLean

Film and television

Film
 The Circus (1928 film), an American film directed by and starring Charlie Chaplin
 Circus (1936 film), a Soviet comedy musical directed by Grigori Aleksandrov
 Circus (1939 film), a Swedish-Danish drama film directed by George Schnéevoigt
 The Circus (1943 film), a Mexican comedy starring Cantinflas
 Circus (2000 film), a British/American neo-noir crime film directed by Rob Walker
 Circus (2009 film), an Indian Kannada-language film directed by Dayal Padmanabhan

Television
 Circus (TV series), a 1989–1990 Indian drama series
 Circus, a 2010 PBS documentary series on the Big Apple Circus
 "Circus" (Aqua Teen Hunger Force), a 2002 episode
 "Circus" (Glenn Martin, DDS), a 2009 episode
 The Circus, the debut episode of the second season of Helluva Boss
 The Circus: Inside the Greatest Political Show on Earth, a 2016 documentary series

Music

Performers
 Circus (American band), a 1970–1975 power pop band
 Circus (French band), a pop group formed in 2012
 Circus (rapper) (21st century), American rapper
 Circus, a 1967–1969 British jazz group that included Mel Collins

Albums
 Circus (Argent album) or the title song, 1975
 Circus (Britney Spears album) or the title song (see below), 2008
 The Circus Starring Britney Spears, a 2009 concert tour
 Circus (Chiaki Kuriyama album), 2011
 Circus (Eraserheads album), 1994
 Circus (FictionJunction Yuuka album), 2007
 Circus (Lenny Kravitz album) or the title song (see below), 1995
 Circus (EP), by Stray Kids, or the title song (see below), 2022
 Circus, by Flairck, 1981
 Circus, by Mary Black, 1995
 Circus, by Teflon Brothers, 2017
 The Circus (Erasure album) or the title song (see below), 1987
 The Circus (Take That album) or the title song, 2008
 The Circus (EP), by Mick Jenkins, 2020
 The Circus, by the Venetia Fair, 2009

Songs
 "Circus" (Britney Spears song), 2008
 "Circus" (Lenny Kravitz song), 1995
 "Circus" (Stray Kids song), 2022
 "Circus", by Brotherhood of Man later reissued on Images, 1977
 "Circus", by Circle from Kollekt, 1998
 "Circus", by Friend & Lover, 1969
 "Circus", by John Cale from Walking on Locusts, 1996
 "Circus", by Kim Taeyeon from Something New, 2018
 "Circus", by John Denver from Rhymes & Reasons, 1969
 "Circus", by MC Mong from Show's Just Begun, 2008
 "Circus", by Sonny & Cher, 1969
 "Circus", by String Driven Thing, 1972
 "Circus", by Summer Walker from Still Over It, 2021
 "Circus", by Tomoyasu Hotei, 1996
 "Circus", by Uriah Heep from Sweet Freedom, 1973
 "Circus", written by Louis Alter, 1949
 "Circus (What I Am)", by Michael Quatro, 1972
 "Cirkus", by King Crimson from Lizard, 1970
 "The Circus" (song), by Erasure, 1987
 "The Circus", by the Clentele from Music for the Age of Miracles, 2017
 "The Circus", by Toby Fox from Deltarune Chapter 1 OST, 2018

Other uses
 Circus (bird), the largest genus of harriers
 Circus (company), a Japanese visual novel studio
 Circus (video game), a Breakout clone released by Exidy in 1977
 Circus offensive, British Royal Air Force bombing operations during World War II
 Secret Intelligence Service (MI6), nicknamed "The Circus", the UK foreign intelligence service
 Circus, a United Kingdom term for a circular road junction

See also 
 Three Ring Circus (disambiguation)
 Two Ring Circus (disambiguation)
 Circus Circus (disambiguation)
 Circus Maximus (disambiguation)
 Flying circus (disambiguation)